Austen D. Lane (born November 9, 1987) is a former American football defensive end and current mixed martial artist. He was drafted by the Jacksonville Jaguars in the fifth round of the 2010 NFL Draft. He played college football at Murray State. He has also been a member of the Kansas City Chiefs, Detroit Lions, and Chicago Bears.

Early years
Lane grew up in Iola, Wisconsin.

Lane made 14.5 sacks on defense and caught 31 passes for 717 yards and 13 touchdowns on offense his senior year at Iola-Scandinavia High School. He earned All-conference and All-region honors for defense and offense and was selected All-state as a defensive end and honorable mention All-state as a wide receiver. Additionally, he had five blocked punts, 77 solo tackles, 61 assisted tackles and four fumble recoveries his senior year. He also earned two letters as a member of the Thunderbirds' basketball team and was named Second-team All-conference in 2004–05.

College career
Lane started 40 of 43 games at Murray State of the Football Championship Subdivision. He holds school records with 29 sacks and 55 tackles for loss. Following his senior year, he was named as a finalist for the Buck Buchanan Award, given to the top defensive player in FCS football. He was named as a FCS first-team All-American by the Associated Press and was selected as the Ohio Valley Conference Defensive Player of the Year.

In 2009 Lane was second in the FCS with 11.0 sacks and third in the FCS with 19.5 tackles-for-loss after leading the OVC in sacks and TFL. He also ended the year with intercepting a pass and returning it 21 yards for a touchdown in a victory over Austin Peay. For the season in 11 games, he had 64 total tackles, 32 solo stops, 19.5 tackles for loss, 11 sacks, 1 interception for 21 yards and  1 touchdown, 3 forced fumbles, 1 fumble recovery, 8 quarterback hurries, 2 pass breakups.

The previous season he played in all 12 games and recorded 63 tackles, ranked second in the country with 22 tackles-for-loss and set MSU single-season record with 12 sacks. In 2007 Lane started 10 games at defensive end and led all defensive linemen with 48 stops, including 28 solo stops. In 2006 as a true freshman he played in 10 games, making 34 tackles, including 11 solo stops. He also had 3.5 tackles for a loss,  finished with 2.5 sacks and had one pass break-up and blocked two kicks.

Professional career

Pre-draft

Following his senior season at Murray State, Lane was invited to participate in the 2010 Senior Bowl as a member of the North roster. He scored a touchdown off a fumble recovery in the second quarter and the North squad went on to win the game over the South 31–13.

Lane was projected to be drafted in the third round of the 2010 NFL Draft by NFLDraftScout.com.

Jacksonville Jaguars
Lane was drafted by the Jacksonville Jaguars in the fifth round (153rd overall) in the 2010 NFL Draft. He was reunited with his college coach Matt Griffin, who had previously been hired by the Jaguars as an offensive assistant. Lane was signed to a contract on July 14, 2010. The deal was for four-years and $1.974 million, including a $184,190 signing bonus.

As a rookie, Lane started nine games for the Jaguars.

He was released on June 13, 2013. He wrote about the experience on Sports Illustrated'''s website.

Kansas City Chiefs
He was claimed off waivers by the Kansas City Chiefs on June 14, 2013.

Detroit Lions
Lane was signed by the Detroit Lions on November 5, 2013, but was cut on November 27.

Chicago Bears
Lane was signed by the Chicago Bears on February 17, 2014, but was released on August 30. He re-signed in December 2014.

Retirement
On August 3, 2015, Austen Lane announced his retirement.

Mixed martial arts career

Amateur career
In November 2015, Lane made his amateur MMA debut, in which he defeated Micah Cross by knockout in the first round. Over the next year, Lane increased his amateur MMA record to 5 wins against no losses with all of his wins coming via knockout.

Professional career
Lane made his professional MMA debut in April 2017. He won his debut via knockout in the first round. Over the following year and into 2018, Lane fought three more times and improved his professional MMA record to 4 wins against no losses with again all of his wins coming via knockout.

In April 2018, it was announced that Lane would face fellow former NFL defensive end Greg Hardy at Dana White's Contender Series 9 on June 12. He lost the fight via knockout in the first round.

Lane returned to the regional MMA circuit to gain more experience, amassing a record of 7 wins and 2 losses over the next four years. This earned him a second shot on Dana White's Contender Series in 2022. He faced Richard Jacobi on September 20, 2022. He won the fight via TKO in the first round and was awarded a UFC contract.

Ultimate Fighting Championship
Lane was scheduled to face Junior Tafa on February 11, 2023 at UFC 284. However, he withdrew from the bout due to undisclosed reasons.

Mixed martial arts professional record

|-
| Win
| align=center|12–3
| Richard Jacobi
| TKO (punches)
| Dana White's Contender Series 55
| 
| align=center|1
| align=center|4:34
| Las Vegas, Nevada, United States
|
|-
|Win
|align=center|11–3
|Eric Lunsford
|TKO (knee injury)
|Fury FC 58
|
|align=center|1
|align=center|1:39
|Dallas, Texas, United States
|
|-
|Win
|align=center|10–3
|Juan Adams
|TKO (punches)
|Fury FC 54
|
|align=center|4
|align=center|0:43
|Houston, Texas, United States
|
|-
|Win
|align=center|9–3
|Rashaun Jackson
|KO (punch)
|Combat Night: Clash of the Titans 5
|
|align=center|1
|align=center|0:31
|Orlando, Florida, United States
|
|-
|Win
|align=center|8–3
|Brad Taylor
|Submission (rear-naked choke)
|Combat Night Pro 20
|
|align=center|1
|align=center|2:35
|Orlando, Florida, United States
|
|-
|Win
|align=center|7–3
|Tebaris Gordon
|TKO (punches)
|Warfare MMA 19
|
|align=center|1
|align=center|2:22
|North Charleston, South Carolina, United States
|
|-
|Loss
|align=center|6–3
|Vernon Lewis
|TKO (punches)
|Legacy Fighting Alliance 83: Jackson vs. Chaulet
|
|align=center|1
|align=center|4:10
|Dallas, Texas, United States
|
|-
|Win
|align=center|6–2
|Cameron Graham
|TKO (punches)
|Combat Night Pro 14
|
|align=center|2
|align=center|1:25
|Tallahassee, Florida, United States
|
|-
|Win
|align=center|5–2
|Brad Taylor
|KO (punches)
|Combat Night Pro 13
|
|align=center|1
|align=center|3:07
|Pensacola, Florida, United States
|
|-
|Loss
|align=center|4–2
|Frank Tate
|TKO (punches)
|Island Fights 50
|
|align=center|1
|align=center|2:41
|Pensacola, Florida, United States
|
|-
|Loss
|align=center|4–1
|Greg Hardy
|TKO (punches)
|Dana White's Contender Series 9
|
|align=center|1
|align=center|0:57
|Las Vegas, Nevada, United States
|
|-
|Win
|align=center|4–0
|Benjamin Rowland  
|TKO (doctor stoppage)
|Warfare MMA 18 
|
|align=center|1
|align=center|3:53
|North Myrtle Beach, South Carolina, United States
|
|-
|Win
|align=center|3–0
|Justin Thornton   
|TKO (punches)
|Battle at the Beach 3 
|
|align=center|1
|align=center|1:39
|Jekyll Island, Georgia, United States
|
|-
|Win
|align=center|2–0
|Johnathan Miller   
|KO (punch)
|Combat Night 72: Pro 2  
|
|align=center|1
|align=center|0:20
|Orlando, Florida, United States
|
|-
|Win
|align=center|1–0
|John Darling  
|TKO (punches) 
|Combat Night 72: Pro 2  
|
|align=center|1
|align=center|0:14
|Sarasota, Florida, United States
|
|}

Personal life
In 2011, Lane was featured on the cover of Eastbay, the popular sporting goods catalog.

Lane gained notoriety in June 2012 after posting a fake workout routine on Twitter.

Lane wrote some columns for Monday Morning Quarterback on the website of Sports Illustrated''.

References

External links
Jacksonville Jaguars bio
Murray State Racers football bio

Living people
1987 births
People from Iola, Wisconsin
Players of American football from Wisconsin
American football defensive ends
Murray State Racers football players
Jacksonville Jaguars players
Kansas City Chiefs players
Detroit Lions players
Chicago Bears players